In the 2020–21 season, Piast Gliwice competed in Ekstraklasa and this season's edition of the Polish Cup. They competed in the UEFA Europa League qualifying phase, but were eliminated in the third qualifying round, following the 3–0 defeat to Copenhagen.

Players

Competitions

Ekstraklasa

Standings

Polish Cup

UEFA Europa League

Qualifying phase

First qualifying round

Second qualifying round

Third qualifying round

References

Sport in Gliwice
Piast Gliwice